Top Stop Music is an independent record label founded by Puerto Rican producer, Sergio George in 2009 based in Delray Beach, Florida.

History
Sergio George was known for producing albums for salsa musicians during his work with RMM Records & Video during the 1990s. Following the purchase of RMM Records in 2001, George left the company to pursue his own independent record. The record's first album, Ciclos by Luis Enrique received a Latin Grammy Award for Best Salsa Album in 2009. The lead single, "Yo No Sé Mañana" was also given a Latin Grammy Award for "Tropical Song of the Year". La India, who worked with George in the past, released her album Unica which reached number one on the Tropical Album charts. Prince Royce, a bachata musician, recorded his own version of "Stand by Me" which peaked at number one on the Tropical Airplay charts. BKidz, a group formed by George, recorded a salsa version of Jackson 5's "ABC".

Roster
 Charlie Aponte
La India
 Gabriella Munoz
 Salsa Giants

Former
Leslie Grace
Toby Love
Tito Nieves
 Eli Jas
 JAZ Cumbia
 Magic Juan
Jonathan Moly
Pee Wee
Prince Royce
 Valentino
 Jorge Villamizar
 Charlie Zaa
 Ziko

References

American independent record labels
Latin American music record labels
Companies based in Florida
Record labels established in 2009